French submarine Joule (Q84) was a Laubeuf type submarine of the Brumaire class, built for the French Navy prior to World War I.

Design and construction 
Joule was ordered by the French Navy as part of its 1906 programme and was laid down at the Toulon Naval Yard in November of that year. Work progressed slowly, and she was not launched until 7 September 1911. She was commissioned on 10 May 1912. 
Joule was equipped with licence-built M.A.N. diesel engines for surface propulsion, and electric motors for power while submerged. She carried eight torpedoes, two internally and six externally.
Joule was named for James Prescott Joule, the 19th century British physicist.

Service history
At the outbreak of the First World War Joule was part of the French Mediterranean Fleet. In the spring of 1915 she was dispatched as part of a French task force to assist in the naval assault on the Dardanelles, the first stage of the Gallipoli campaign.

At the end of April, under the command of Lt. L Aubert Dupetit-Thouars, Joule began an attempt to penetrate the straits in order to attack Turkish shipping in the Sea of Marmara. However, on 1 May 1915 all contact was lost. It was later established Joule ran into a Turkish minefield, struck a mine, and was sunk. All 31 of her crew were lost.

Notes

Bibliography

 Moore, J: Jane’s Fighting Ships of World War I (1919, reprinted 2003)

External links
 Castel, Marc: Joule at Sous-marins Français 1863 - pagesperso-orange.fr (French)

Brumaire-class submarines
World War I submarines of France
1911 ships
Ships built in France
Maritime incidents in 1915
World War I shipwrecks in the Dardanelles
Ships sunk by mines